Lilianna Zinovyevna Lungina (16 June 1920 Smolensk, Russia – 13 January 1998 Moscow, Russia ) was a Russian translator from French, German, Norwegian, Danish and Swedish languages. She translated into Russian:
 tales by Astrid Lindgren,
 plays by August Strindberg and Henrik Ibsen,
 stories by Heinrich Böll,
 novels by Boris Vian and Romain Gary, 
 works of Friedrich Schiller, Knut Hamsun, Herman Bang, Gerhart Hauptmann, Colette and many others

She is the subject of a 15-episode TV documentary "Podstrochnik" ("Translation") by director . The documentary was forbidden from showing for 11 years but after the release became a TV hit that won the TEFI prize in 2010. Her monologue has been published as a book Word for Word: A Memoir, which also contains the text that had not been included in the documentary. The book was a bestseller in Russia.

She was the wife of the screenwriter Semen Lungin (1920–96) and the mother of film director Pavel Lungin.

Books
Word for Word: A Translator's Memoir of Literature, Politics, and Survival in Soviet Russia. - Lilianna Lungina as told to Oleg Dorman. [Translated from the Russian by Polly Gannon and Ast. A. Moore.] London: Overlook Duckworth, 2014.
Les saisons de Moscou : 1933-1990 : racontées à Claude Kiejman par Lila Lounguina. Paris: Plon, 1990.

References

External links
One Womans Tale of Soviet Life Grips Nation
Soviet-Era Tale Enthralls Russian TV Viewers

1920 births
1998 deaths
20th-century Russian translators
People from Smolensk
Soviet translators